Szymanowski (feminine: Szymanowska; plural: Szymanowscy) is a Polish surname. Notable people with the surname include:

 Alexander Szymanowski (born 1988), Argentine footballer
 Antoni Szymanowski (born 1951), Polish footballer
 Celina Szymanowska (1812–1855), daughter of Maria
 Filipina Brzezińska-Szymanowska (1800–1886), Polish pianist and composer
 Karol Szymanowski (1882–1937), Polish composer
 Maria Szymanowska (1789–1831), Polish composer
 Marianela Szymanowski (born 1990), Argentine footballer, sister of Alexander
 Theodore de Korwin Szymanowski (1846–1901), Polish writer
 Wacław Szymanowski (1859–1930), Polish sculptor
 Wiktoryna Szymanowska (1835–1874), Polish actress
 Korwin-Szymanowski family, a Polish noble family

See also
 
 

Polish-language surnames